Jordan Cravens Cameron (born August 7, 1988) is an American former professional football player who was a tight end in the National Football League (NFL). He played college football for the USC Trojans and was drafted by the Cleveland Browns in the fourth round of the 2011 NFL Draft. Cameron also played for the Miami Dolphins.

Early years
Cameron was born on August 7, 1988, in Los Angeles, California, the son of Stan and Cathy Cameron (née Cravens), who works for a telecommunications company. He was raised Mormon (LDS).  Cameron attended Newbury Park High School in Newbury Park, California.  He made the All-Marmonte League first-team in 2005 as a junior.  As a senior in 2006, he made Prep Star All-West and once again made All-Marmonte League first-team.  He caught 73 passes for 1,022 yards and 12 touchdowns in his senior year. He was a teammate of former San Jose State' quarterback Jordan LaSecla.  He also starred in basketball and volleyball at Newbury Park High.

Collegiate career

After high school, Cameron decided to play basketball at Brigham Young University rather than football.  After redshirting his freshman year (2006–07), he decided to give football another try. He transferred to USC in 2007 to play football as a wide receiver.  However, when USC refused to accept some of Cameron's credits from Brigham Young, he was forced to withdraw and attend Ventura College.  He missed the football season but was given the option to try to rejoin the team in 2008.  Even if he had stayed at USC, due to NCAA transfer rules he would have been ineligible to play in 2007.
Cameron ended up enrolling at USC a year later and saw brief action for the Trojans at wide receiver in the 2008 and 2009 seasons, but did not make any catches.  Prior to his senior year, he embraced a move from receiver to tight end. In his final season at USC, Cameron caught 16 passes for 126 yards and a touchdown.

Professional career

Pre-draft
After his senior season at USC, Cameron was invited to play in the East–West Shrine Game where he made a big impression on the coaches during the week of practice. Cameron helped his draft stock significantly during his workouts at the NFL Combine. He was in the top three of every drill he participated in and fifth in bench press reps. He was projected to be a mid-to-late-round pick in the 2011 NFL Draft.

Cleveland Browns
Cameron was selected by the Cleveland Browns with the 102nd pick in the 2011 NFL Draft.

On December 27, 2013, Jordan Cameron was voted to the Pro Bowl.

Miami Dolphins
Cameron signed a two-year, $15 million (with $5 million guaranteed) deal with the Miami Dolphins on March 12, 2015. He was placed on injured reserve on November 5, 2016, after suffering a season-ending concussion injury.

On March 10, 2017, after suffering four concussions in six seasons, Cameron announced his retirement from the NFL.

NFL statistics

 Selected to the Pro Bowl

Personal life
Cameron’s sister Brynn played guard on the USC women's basketball team. (She also has a child with Matt Leinart and shares custody of two children with NBA Star Blake Griffin.) His younger brother Colby was an undrafted free agent quarterback for the Carolina Panthers, but was released before the 2013 NFL season. He is also the cousin of former Denver Broncos safety Su'a Cravens.
He has three sons: one from a previous relationship, and two with Elin Nordegren, the ex-wife of Tiger Woods (with whom she has two older children).

References

External links

 NFL Combine bio
 ESPN.com bio

Living people
1988 births
American football tight ends
American sportspeople of Samoan descent
USC Trojans football players
Cleveland Browns players
Miami Dolphins players
Players of American football from Los Angeles
People from Newbury Park, California
Unconferenced Pro Bowl players
Sportspeople from Ventura County, California